An ersatz good is a substitute good, especially one that is considered inferior to the good it replaces. It has particular connotations of wartime usage.

Etymology
Ersatz is a German word literally meaning substitute or replacement. Although it is used as an adjective in English, it is a noun in German. In German orthography noun phrases formed are usually represented as a single word, forming compound nouns such as Ersatzteile ("spare parts") or Ersatzspieler ("substitute player"). While ersatz in English generally means that the substitution is of unsatisfactory or inferior quality compared with the "real thing", in German, there is no such implication: e.g., Ersatzteile 'spare parts' is a technical expression without any implication about quality, whereas Kaffeeersatz 'coffee substitute' is not made from coffee beans, and is thus inferior. The term for inferior substitute in German would be Surrogat, which is cognate to English word "surrogate".

Historical context

World War I
In the opening months of World War I, replacement troops for battle-depleted German infantry units were drawn from lesser-trained Ersatz Corps, which were less effective than the troops they replaced.

Another example of the word's usage in Germany exists in the German naval construction programs at the beginning of the 20th century. In this context, the phrasing "Ersatz (ship name)" indicates that a new, larger or more capable ship was a replacement for an ageing or lost vessel. Because German practice was not to reveal the name of a new ship until its launch, this meant that the ship was known by its "Ersatz (ship name)" throughout its construction.

The Allied naval blockade of Germany limited maritime commerce with Germany, forcing Germany and Austria-Hungary to develop substitutes for products such as chemical compounds and provisions. More than 11,000 ersatz products were sold in Germany during the war. Patents for ersatz products were granted for 6000 varieties of beer, wine and lemonade; 1000 kinds of soup cubes; 837 types of sausage and 511 assortments of coffee.

Ersatz products developed in Germany and Austria-Hungary during this time included:
synthetic rubber Kautschuk produced from petroleum for rubber
benzene for heating oil (coal gas)
industrial lubricants made by extracting oils from coal tar and brown-coal slags
synthetic camphor for imported natural camphor
nitrate crepe paper made from cellulose for gun cotton
glycerin from sugar rather than fats
gypsum-yielded sulphur
pigeon guano used to make fertilizer
flowers and weeds processed to make alcohol for ammunition
rosins and gums extracted from coal derivatives
tea composed of roasted barley, grasses, wild flowers, ground raspberry leaves or catnip
coffee substitute using roasted acorns, chicory and beechnuts (stretched with caramel-flavoured raw sugar and beet flower later in the war)
butter replaced by curdled milk, sugar and food colouring
cooking oil replaced by a mixture of beets, carrots, turnips and spices
salad oil was 99 per cent mucilage
eggs replaced by yellow-coloured corn or potato flour
ground European beetles (cockchafers) and linden wood replaced fats
sausage made of water, plant fibres, animal scraps and blood - (the infamous 'war sausage' which was equated to 'a mouthful of sawdust')
bouillon cubes made 70-90 per cent of salt rather than meat extract
wheat flour stretched by adding potato flour and powdered hay
chocolates and cocoa replaced by ground cocoa shells and mixed pure pepper
oil and sunflower 'cakes' replaced corn and oats as horse feed
rapeseed, poppy and mustard 'cakes' replaced green feed for cattle
paper, peat, reeds, bulrushes and free-growing stinging nettle fibres replaced cotton in textiles
wood and paper used for shoe soles

Germany also stretched its supply of petrol with 'gasohol' (Benzolspiritus), which by today's standards would be classed as E25 petrol, consisting of 75% petrol and 25% distilled alcohol, likely ethanol.

World War II
In World War II, Ersatzbrot (substitute bread) made of potato starch, frequently stretched with extenders such as sawdust, was furnished to soldiers as Kommissbrot, a dark German bread baked from rye and other flours used for military rations, and also to prisoners of war. One recipe discovered in the Food Providing Ministry in Berlin, labeled "(Top Secret) Berlin 24.X1 1941", contained 50% bruised rye grain, 20% sliced sugar beets, 20% "tree flour" (sawdust), and 10% minced leaves and straw.

During the siege of Leningrad, its citizens were given ersatz flour instead of actual wheat flour (of which there was an extremely limited supply then) by the Soviet authorities. The lack of proper food with any nutrition meant that the city residents not only starved but became vulnerable to deadly illnesses and diseases (such as dysentery) owing to their weakened physical conditions. As a result, the word ersatz entered as a pejorative into Russian and other Slavic languages.

In Britain, this was additionally popularised as an adjective from the experiences of thousands of U.S., British, and other English-speaking combat personnel, primarily airmen, who were captured in the European Theater of Operations during World War II. These Allied prisoners of war were given ersatz goods such as Ersatzkaffee, an inferior Getreidekaffee or "grain coffee" as a coffee substitute by their German captors.

Eastern Bloc
In the Eastern Bloc, many agricultural goods could not be produced domestically, such as tea, coffee, nuts, and citrus fruits. These were generally imported from abroad with scarce foreign currency reserves, or inferior substitutes were produced domestically. In 1977, the East German coffee crisis resulted in the introduction of many coffee substitutes, which were generally rejected by the population. Replacements for orangeat and succade were made from candied carrot and unripe tomatoes.

Effectiveness 

When people are asked to choose an ersatz good, they tend to prefer a substitute from the same category as the good they desire to a goal-derived substitute, one that meets the same goal. For instance, a person who desires a gourmet chocolate is more likely to choose another, less expensive chocolate as a substitute than a different kind of dessert or snack. Because such "within-category" substitutes are easier to compare to the desired good, however, those that are inferior are less effective than "cross-category" substitutes that fulfil the same goal. People are more able to notice their inferiority during consumption, which leads them to be less satisfying than goal-derived substitutes from different taxonomic categories.

During the First World War in Germany and Austria-Hungary, people succumbed to sickness from the consumption of ersatz goods.

In Austria, the term "Vienna sickness" was coined after malnutrition from was linked to a cause of the tuberculosis epidemic (10,000 reported cases)

In Germany, Princess Blücher suffered from influenza in 1916, suggesting that she was suffering from "ersatz illness".  She writes: "everyone is feeling ill from too many chemicals in the hotel food. I don't believe that Germany will ever be starved out, but she will be poisoned out first with these substitutes."

See also

Adulterant
Austerity
Backstop resources
Claytons, a word used in Australian and New Zealand English
Counterfeit
Giffen good, a good for which there is no ersatz replacement, causing demand to rise with prices

References

German words and phrases
Goods (economics)
Imitation foods
Perfect competition
Survival skills